Riihimäki Cocks is a Finnish handball club from Riihimäki.

The club is playing in the Finnish Handball League (SM-liiga), and play their home matches in Cocks Areena.

History
Riihimäki Cocks were founded in 1973 when the club decided to separate from RiPS. The newly founded team gained promotion to Finnish Handball Championship League during the following season.

The team won their first Championship medals in 1978, when the team finished second in the championship.

Riihimäki Cocks got their first Finnish handball championships in 2007 and repeated the success in 2008. Cocks also won the Finnish Cup in 2007 and 2008, winning the double two times consecutively.

Honours

Finnish Handball League: 12
: 2007, 2008, 2009, 2010, 2013, 2014, 2015, 2016, 2017, 2018, 2019, 2021
: 1978, 1979, 2005, 2011
: 1998, 2000, 2006, 2012

Finnish Cup of Handball: 10
: 2007, 2008, 2010, 2011, 2013, 2015, 2016, 2017, 2018, 2019

Baltic Handball League : 4
: 2016, 2017, 2018, 2019
: 2010, 2013, 2015
: 2014

European record 

Cocks
Finnish handball clubs

Team

Current squad
Squad for the 2022–23 season

Goalkeepers
 12  Nicolas Gauthier
 16  Dmitry Kholmov
 87  Vitalii Shitsko
Left Wingers
 15  Teemu Tamminen (c)
 26  Julius Kemppainen
Right Wingers
4  Oreste Vescovo
 63  Nuno Santos
Line players
 17  Yury Lukyanchuk
 25  Santeri Vainionpää
 44  Davor Basarić

Left Backs
3  Igor Mandić
9  Edson Imare
 29  Teimuraz Orjonikidze
Central Backs
7  Piotr Rybski
 21  Luka Brkljačić
 51  Roope Ahlgren
 84  Miika Kaukoranta
Right Backs
 23  Vitalie Nenita
 99  Pavel Duda

Technical staff
  Head Coach: Christophe Viennet
  Assistant Coach: Bojan Županjac

External links
 http://cocks.fi/historia/
Official website
 https://www.baltichandball.net/history
 https://msm.finnhandball.net/historia/miesten-suomen-cup/
 https://msm.finnhandball.net/historia/miesten-sm-sarjan-mitalitaulukko/ 
 https://msm.finnhandball.net/historia/miesten-sm-sarjan-mitalijoukkueet/